Alican Güney (born 25 February 1989) is a Turkish professional basketball player who plays for OGM Ormanspor of the TBL.

References

External links
Profile at galatasaray.org
Profile at tblstat.net
Profile at tbl.org.tr

1989 births
Living people
Afyonkarahisar Belediyespor players
Antalya Büyükşehir Belediyesi players
Büyükçekmece Basketbol players
Fenerbahçe men's basketball players
Galatasaray S.K. (men's basketball) players
Small forwards
Basketball players from Istanbul
Trabzonspor B.K. players
Turkish men's basketball players
Yeşilgiresun Belediye players